The Harry Newell is a highspeed fireboat operated out of Ketchikan, Alaska, since August, 1986. Her pumps can throw 5,000 gallons per minute through four water cannons.

She replaced a wooden fireboat with a pumping capacity of 4,000 gallons per minute.

Ketchikan is built on a narrow strip of low-lying land that back on to mountains.  Locals say the city is "five miles long and two blocks wide," which means much of it is within range of a fireboat's pumps.

The vessel is named after Harry Newell, a Ketchikan firefighter who died in the line of duty in 1955.  He was the first and only Ketchikan firefighter to die on duty.

The Harry Newell was held in reserve when the fishing vessel Sable had a fire, at her moorings, on January 25, 2010.

Early on the morning of October 18, 2016, a fire was detected in a dwelling on Gravina Island.  The Harry Newell responded.  Firefighters were unable to save the building, but prevented the fire spreading.

References

Fireboats of Alaska
1986 ships